Edward Lynn "Len" Denton (born August 25, 1958) is an American retired professional wrestler, better known by his ring name, The Grappler.

Professional wrestling career
Len Denton worked early in his career under a few different monikers and wrestled all over the territories across North America. His first real push came in the Southern territories first capturing titles in the Mid-South promotion. In Memphis with a young Jim Cornette as his manager he was teamed with Tony Anthony to become The Grapplers, Denton was the main star. The Grapplers would eventually leave Memphis and travel to the Central States area winning tag team gold there as well. Winning the AWA Southern Tag Titles and feuding with the Fabulous Ones. They then teamed with manager Jimmy Hart to become The Dirty White Boys. They achieved some success with this new gimmick, but then went back to The Grapplers gimmick.

At this point in their careers Anthony and Denton split up, with Anthony wrestling as The Dirty White Boy, and Denton taking the Grappler gimmick to Texas before eventually moving on to the Pacific Northwest. While Denton was wrestling there in the early 1990s, a local jobber named Bobby Blair assumed the "Dirty White Boy" moniker, though he had no connection to Anthony.

The Grappler has an in extensive history in Mid-South Wrestling as a wrestler and in the Pacific Northwest as wrestler, booker, promoter, trainer and most recently (after neck surgery) a manager. The Grappler is one of the last remaining wrestlers from the NWA Pacific Northwest (Portland Wrestling) days. In February 1988, he challenged Curt Hennig for the AWA World Heavyweight Championship, which was marred by controversy, as the title was held up due to the match ending in a no-contest. A rematch was held on March 5, but he was defeated by Hennig's replacement, The Assassin, who helped Hennig regain the title.

Jake "The Snake" Roberts claims that in a Mid-South Wrestling bout, Jake "The Snake" Roberts put Denton in a front facelock and during the move Jake tripped on Denton's foot, falling backwards, causing Denton to fall on his head. As a result, Roberts claims to have invented the professional wrestling move known as the DDT. 

During the late 1990s, Denton worked for World Championship Wrestling under his real name. Of note is his title match against the undefeated WCW United States Champion Bill Goldberg on the May 11, 1998 edition of Monday Nitro. Play-by-play announcer Mike Tenay described Denton as "a very accomplished veteran grappler."

The Grappler was active as a wrestler for and operated as the president of the booking committee for the new Portland Wrestling from 2001 to 2006.

The Grappler announced his "return from retirement" on January 10, 2010. He would be working as the head booker for a small Portland Oregon pro wrestling company known as the North West Wrestling Alliance (NWWA). As of August 2010 Denton was working as the booker for DOA, NWWA, and Portland Wrestling in Portland, Oregon.  As of November 2012, he was also a booker for Portland Wrestling Uncut, a revival of the original Portland Wrestling promotion (then owned by Don and Barry Owen, now owned by Don Coss and co-booked by Rowdy Roddy Piper).  That promotion closed in early 2013.

On August 11, 2013, The Grappler appeared on Championship Wrestling from Hollywood and stated his intention to manage an up-and-coming wrestler and create a successor to the legacy of The Grappler.

In October 2013, The Grappler managed Jeremy Blanchard in the West Coast Wrestling Connection when Blanchard won the WCWC Legacy Championship. In December 2013, The Grappler recreated the "Wrecking Crew" with a new Grappler (Erik Baeden), Jeremy Blanchard, Othello and Alexander Hammerstone. He now appears with the Wrecking Crew on the WCWC's weekly television broadcast on KPDX-TV.

Championships and accomplishments
 Cauliflower Alley Club
 Men's Wrestling Award (2015)
 Central States Wrestling
 NWA Central States Tag Team Championship (2 times) – with Tony Anthony
 Continental Wrestling Association
 AWA Southern Tag Team Championship (1 time) - with Tony Anthony
 Iconic Heroes Wrestling Excellence
 Southern Wrestling Hall of Fame (2015)
 Mid-South Wrestling Association
 Mid-South Mississippi Championship (2 times)
 Mid-South North American Championship (1 time)
 Mid-South Tag Team Championship (1 time) - with Super Destroyer
 Pacific Northwest Wrestling
 NWA Pacific Northwest Heavyweight Championship (7 times)
NWA Pacific Northwest Tag Team Championship (10 times) - with Terminator (1), Abbuda Dein (1), Scotty the Body (1), Brian Adams, (1), The Equalizer (2), Don Harris (1), and Steve Doll (3)
 Ring Around The Northwest Newsletter
 Wrestler of the Year (1987)
 Southwest Championship Wrestling
 SCW Southwest Tag Team Championship (2 times) - with Tony Anthony
 West Coast Wrestling Connection
 WCWC Legacy Championship (1 time)
 World Class Championship Wrestling
 NWA Texas Heavyweight Championship (1 time)

Bibliography 
 Grappler: Memoirs of a Masked Madman (2014) – with Joe Vithayathil

References

External links
 
 

1958 births
20th-century professional wrestlers
21st-century professional wrestlers
American male professional wrestlers
Living people
Masked wrestlers
Professional wrestlers from Texas
Stampede Wrestling alumni